Dutchess County, New York maintains a system of signed county routes primarily to serve local traffic between the various communities in the county. Route numbers below 100 generally increase progressively based on the alphabetical order of the towns where they are primarily located, beginning with Amenia and ending with Washington; however, several exceptions exist. The newer routes numbered 100 and up do not follow this pattern. County routes in Dutchess County never enter cities and only a few enter villages. Routes are signed with the Manual on Uniform Traffic Control Devices-standard yellow-on-blue pentagon route marker. These pentagon markers began to appear through the county in 1985.

Routes 1–50

Routes 51–100

Routes 101 and up

See also

County routes in New York

References

External links